Mirtha Brock Forbes (born 9 April 1970) is a retired female track and field athlete from Colombia, who competed in the sprint events during her career.

Career
She represented her native country in two consecutive Summer Olympics, starting in 1996. As well as in two world championships in 1995 and 1997. Brock won two bronze medals in the relay at the 1995 Pan American Games in Mar del Plata, Argentina.

Achievements

External links

1970 births
Living people
Colombian female sprinters
Pan American Games medalists in athletics (track and field)
Athletes (track and field) at the 1995 Pan American Games
Athletes (track and field) at the 1999 Pan American Games
Athletes (track and field) at the 2003 Pan American Games
Olympic athletes of Colombia
Athletes (track and field) at the 1996 Summer Olympics
Athletes (track and field) at the 2000 Summer Olympics
Pan American Games bronze medalists for Colombia
South American Games bronze medalists for Colombia
South American Games medalists in athletics
Competitors at the 1994 South American Games
Central American and Caribbean Games gold medalists for Colombia
Competitors at the 2002 Central American and Caribbean Games
Central American and Caribbean Games medalists in athletics
Medalists at the 1995 Pan American Games
Olympic female sprinters
People from Archipelago of San Andrés, Providencia and Santa Catalina
20th-century Colombian women
21st-century Colombian women